Rebecca Ann Evans is a Welsh operatic soprano.

Personal life
Evans was born in Pontrhydyfen.

She married Stephen Jones in 1997, and they have one son, William. They live in Penarth, South Wales.

Career
Evans studied at the Guildhall School of Music and Drama.

Evans has performed as Susanna (The Marriage of Figaro) for the Santa Fe Opera; Adele (Die Fledermaus) for the Chicago Lyric Opera; Zerlina (Don Giovanni), Ann Trulove (The Rake's Progress) and Adina (L'elisir d'amore) for San Francisco Opera; and both Susanna and Zerlina for the Metropolitan Opera, New York.

She has appeared at the BBC Proms and the Edinburgh Festival; at a Gala Concert to celebrate the opening of the Welsh Assembly in the presence of the Queen and the Prince of Wales; and in Bremen with Andrea Bocelli and the London Philharmonic Orchestra.

Her recordings include Ilia (Idomeneo), Pamina (The Magic Flute) and Susanna (The Marriage of Figaro) for Chandos; Nanetta (Falstaff) for Decca, and a solo recording of Italian songs for EMI. She has also recorded three soprano parts in a series of Gilbert & Sullivan operettas: the Plaintiff in Trial by Jury, Mabel in The Pirates of Penzance and Josephine in H.M.S. Pinafore. She participated in the second recording of Delius's Requiem (1996, under Richard Hickox). She has also sung Belinda in the BBC film of Dido and Aeneas and hosted the BBC television series A Touch of Classics with the BBC National Orchestra of Wales. She was also a guest artist on the 2008 BBC2 series Maestro presented by Clive Anderson.

She is an Honorary Fellow of the Royal Welsh College of Music and Drama and was awarded an honorary degree, Doctor of Music, from the University of Glamorgan in 1997. She is also vice-president of the Welsh homelessness charity Shelter Cymru and Patron of Music in Hospitals Cymru/Wales.

On 1 May 2009, Evans was awarded an honorary degree Doctor of Music from the University of Wales.

Honours and awards
Evans was appointed by the Eisteddfod as a member of the Gorsedd of Bards. Created in 1792 as celebration of Welsh heritage, the Gorsedd are those who have contributed significantly to Welsh culture.
Morriston Orpheus Choir Supporters' Association (MOCSA) Young Welsh Singer of the Year 1989
Evans was appointed Commander of the Order of the British Empire (CBE) in the 2020 Birthday Honours for services to the arts in Wales.

Opera recordings

References

External links
Rebecca Evans' Artist Management Askonas Holt
Rebecca Evans BBC – Big Welsh Challenge 2007/2008 -Celebrity Team
Rebecca Evans & Simon Keenlyside perform with Sting & Trudie Styler – Article
Rebecca Evans Interview 5 July 2007 – Music Critic. Com
Rebecca Evans GRAMMY NOMINATION 2008
http://www.roh.org.uk/people/rebecca-evans

1963 births
Living people
People from Neath Port Talbot
Alumni of the Guildhall School of Music and Drama
People associated with the Royal Welsh College of Music & Drama
Welsh operatic sopranos
Commanders of the Order of the British Empire
Grammy Award winners
21st-century Welsh women opera singers